The 4th Combat Aviation Brigade is a Combat Aviation Brigade of the United States Army based at Fort Carson.

Structure
 6th Attack Reconnaissance Squadron, 17th Cavalry Regiment
 2nd Battalion (General Support), 4th Aviation Regiment (2nd General Support Battalion 4th Aviation Regiment)
 3rd Battalion (Assault Helicopter), 4th Aviation Regiment (3rd Assault Helicopter Battalion 4th Aviation Regiment)
 4th Battalion (Attack Reconnaissance), 4th Aviation Regiment (4th Attack Reconnaissance Battalion 4th Aviation Regiment)
 404th Aviation Support Battalion (404th ASB)

References

Aviation Brigades of the United States Army